The following lists events that happened in 1935 in El Salvador.

Incumbents
President: Andrés Ignacio Menéndez (until 1 March), Maximiliano Hernández Martínez (starting 1 March)
Vice President: Vacant

Events

January
 13–15 January – Voters in El Salvador voted Maximiliano Hernández Martínez as President of El Salvador with 329,555 votes in a 100% margin. He was the only candidate.

March
 1 March – National Pro Patria Party candidate Maximiliano Hernández Martínez was sworn in as President of El Salvador.
 16 March – Maximiliano Hernández Martínez opened the 1935 Central American and Caribbean Games in San Salvador.

April
 5 April – The 1935 Central American and Caribbean Games concluded. El Salvador won 18 medals: 4 gold, 4 silver, and 10 bronze.
 26 April – The Salvadoran Football Federation was established.

Deaths 

 10 December – Pío Romero Bosque, politician (b. 1860)

References

 
El Salvador
1930s in El Salvador
Years of the 20th century in El Salvador
El Salvador